Connor Jones (born August 16, 1990) is a Canadian former professional ice hockey forward appeared in the National Hockey League (NHL) with the New York Islanders.

Career
Undrafted, Jones played collegiate hockey with Quinnipiac University of the ECAC from 2010 to 2014. Jones played a majority of his Quinnipiac career on a line with his identical twin brother Kellen, who was drafted by the Edmonton Oilers in the seventh round of the 2010 NHL Entry Draft. The Bobcats lost to Yale in the 2013 NCAA National Championship game. At the completion of his senior year as an alternate captain with the Bobcats, Jones embarked on his professional career in signing a one-year AHL contract for the 2014–15 season, with the Oklahoma City Barons, the primary affiliate of the Oilers, on April 3, 2014. He immediately joined the Barons on an amateur try-out basis to complete the 2013–14 season.

In the midst of his second season with the Bridgeport Sound Tigers in 2016–17, Jones was signed his first NHL contract on a one-year entry-level contract with parent affiliate, the New York Islanders on February 22, 2017. In the final stages of the Islanders season, Jones received his first NHL recall on April 2, 2017. Added to inject energy to the fourth-line, Jones made his debut that night in a 4–2 victory over the Buffalo Sabres.

Jones started the 2017–18 season with the Sound Tigers after he was cut from Islanders camp. He earned a three-game suspension for slew-footing Utica Comets defenceman Jordan Subban during a game on December 1, 2017.

At the completion of his contract with the Islanders, Jones became a free agent however opted to continue within the Islanders organization in signing a one-year AHL contract with the Sound Tigers on July 9, 2018. In his final season with the Sound Tigers in 2018–19, Jones contributed with 6 goals and 13 points in 67 games.

As an impending free agent, Jones reunited with his brother Kellen, signing a one-year contract as a duo with Swiss second-tier club, HC Thurgau of the Swiss League, on May 16, 2019.

Following a second season abroad with Västerviks IK of the HockeyAllsvenskan, Jones returned to North America as a free agentin signing alongside brother Kellen to a contract for the 2021–22 season with defending Kelly Cup champions, the Fort Wayne Komets of the ECHL, on August 31, 2021. Jones contributed with 39 points in 52 games with the Komets, before opting to end his eight year professional career at the conclusion of the season.

Personal life 
Connor and his twin brother Kellen, who was often a teammate through his professional career, grew up in Montrose, British Columbia, and both played hockey for Quinnipiac University and the Bridgeport Sound Tigers.

Career statistics

Awards and honours

References

External links 
 

1990 births
Living people
Bakersfield Condors (1998–2015) players
Bridgeport Sound Tigers players
Canadian ice hockey centres
Fort Wayne Komets players
Ice hockey people from British Columbia
New York Islanders players
Oklahoma City Barons players
Quinnipiac Bobcats men's ice hockey players
HC Thurgau players
Twin sportspeople
Canadian twins
Undrafted National Hockey League players
Västerviks IK players
Vernon Vipers players